Walter Wobmann (born 21 November 1957) is a Swiss politician for the Swiss People's Party.

Biography 
Wobmann has held an MP position at the National Council of Switzerland since 2003. He is a member of the Campaign for an Independent and Neutral Switzerland.

Wobmann has campaigned against minarets in Switzerland as president of the committee in support of the Swiss minaret ban referendum in 2009. In 2016, Wobmann has introduced legislation to disallow the wearing of the hijabs in passport photos; this proposal was likened to the French ban on face covering. This would change current Swiss law, which allows the wearing of religious headscarves in photographs taken for Swiss passports and driver's licenses, so long as the face is identifiable. He has been considered a part of the counter-jihad movement.

Notes and references 
 Site internet de Walter Wobmann

References

1960 births
Living people
Anti-Islam sentiment in Switzerland
Counter-jihad activists
Critics of Islam
People from Entlebuch District
Swiss People's Party politicians
Members of the National Council (Switzerland)
Campaign for an Independent and Neutral Switzerland